The Danish women's national ice hockey team is the women's national ice hockey team of Denmark. The team represents Denmark at the International Ice Hockey Federation (IIHF) World Women's Ice Hockey Championship and other international tournaments. The team is organized by the Danmarks Ishockey Union. Denmark had 702 female players registered with the IIHF in 2020, an increase from 406 players in 2014.

Tournament record

Olympic Games
 2022 – Finished 10th

World Championship
1992 – Finished 7th
1999 – Finished 6th in Group B
2000 – Finished 4th in Group B
2001 – Finished 8th in Division I (relegated to Division II)
2003 – Finished 2nd in Division II
2004 – Finished 1st in Division II (promoted to Division I)
2005 – Finished 5th in Division I
2007 – Finished 6th in Division I (relegated to Division II)
2008 – Finished 2nd in Division II
2009 – Finished 5th in Division II
2011 – Finished 3rd in Division II
2012 – Finished 1st in Division IB (promoted to Division IA)
2013 – Finished 2nd in Division IA
2014 – Finished 3rd in Division IA
2015 – Finished 4th in Division IA
2016 – Finished 4th in Division IA
2017 – Finished 4th in Division IA
2018 – Finished 4th in Division IA
2019 – Finished 2nd in Division IA (promoted to Top Division)
2020 – Cancelled due to the coronavirus pandemic
2021 – Finished 10th
2022 – Finished 10th (relegated to Division I)

European Championship
1989 –  Finished 6th
1991 –  Finished 3rd  Won Bronze Medal
1993 –  Finished 6th (relegated to Group B)
1995 –  Finished 2nd in Group B
1996 –  Finished 1st in Group B

Current roster
Roster for the 2022 IIHF Women's World Championship.

Head coach: Björn Edlund

References

External links
 
IIHF profile

Ice hockey
Women's national ice hockey teams in Europe